The Directorate-General for Regional and Urban Policy (DG REGIO) is a Directorate-General of the European Commission.

The DG Regional and Urban Policy is responsible for European Union measures to assist the economic and social development of the less-favored regions of the European Union under Articles 158 and 160 of the Treaty of Rome.

Instruments - Funds 
European Regional Development Fund (ERDF); 
European Structural and Investment Funds (Cohesion Fund)
Instrument for Structural Policies for Pre-Accession (ISPA)
European Union Solidarity Fund

See also
European Social Fund
European Commissioner for Cohesion and Reforms

References

External links
Regional Policy Directorate-General
Regional Policy - Inforegio

Regional Policy